Gibbage is a fighting game developed by Zombie Cow Studios. It was released on April 25, 2006 for Windows.

The game was a 2007 IGF Award nominee.

Gameplay 

Two characters spawn, one belonging to each player, called clones. Clones spawn from what is known as the power booth. Each power booth has a power level which drains perpetually. In order to keep the power booth's power level from dropping to zero, the players must collect power cubes, and then bring them back to their booth. Each player is equipped with a weapon called a Gibber with which to defend themselves and destroy their enemy. When a player is destroyed, he loses a portion of his power and must wait whilst a new clone is created.

When the new clone is created, the player takes control of it and direct conflict resumes. In addition to power cubes, from time to time a power-up item will appear. Collecting this will give the player one of a variety of upgrades or effects, such as an extra Gibber, a rocket launcher, or it may freeze opponents solid or reduce them to a single hit point. The game ends when all but one players have had their power level reduced to zero. The remaining player is the winner.

Development 
The game was developed for PC Zone magazine as part of a 10 part series on learning how to code an indie game. Developer Dan Marshall had formerly worked in the television industry. He had always thought that developing a game was easy, but had a "harsh awakening". The game was released as freeware in 2011.

Reception 
William Usher of Game Tunnel gave the game a "buy" recommendation, calling the action "fast-paced" and saying that "it will occupy many of your waking hours". Alec Meer of Rock, Paper, Shotgun said that the game "has a particularly neat two-player mode".

References

External links
 Official website

2006 video games
Fighting games
Windows games
Windows-only games
Indie video games
Video games developed in the United Kingdom
Size Five Games games
Multiplayer and single-player video games